Mark Edwin Eubank is a retired Salt Lake City, Utah television broadcasting meteorologist who served as chief meteorologist for the 2002 Winter Olympics.

Career
Eubank joined the KSL-TV channel 5 Television news team in 1990 as their chief meteorologist. Prior to KSL, he was employed as a meteorologist for KUTV channel 2 in Utah, a position he had held since 1967. Eubank began his meteorology career at age 24 in Redding, California, at KRCR-TV. He attended UCLA and graduated from the University of Utah in 1972 with a Bachelor of Science in Meteorology. Eubank also owned and operated a weather consulting firm, WeatherBank, Inc. for 20 years.

Distinction
 Eubank was famous for wearing a white sports coat throughout a broadcast preceding or during a snow fall.
 Indian weather lore such as a Thunder Moon and a Sun dog was often used in his broadcasts.
 "Never trust a split jet stream" was an often repeated phrase during his weather reports.
 Eubank also quoted John Ruskin regularly, saying "There is no such thing as bad weather, only different kinds of good weather."

Career highlights
Eubank was the chief meteorologist of the 2002 Winter Olympics.

Family
Eubank is the father of Sharon Eubank who was a member of the General Relief Society Presidency of the Church of Jesus Christ of Latter-day Saints from 2017 to 2022.

Retirement
On November 29, 2006, Eubank signed off the air for the final time. He passed his job and white coat to his son Kevin Eubank. Shortly after retiring, he and his wife served two Latter-day Saint missions; first one year in St. George, Utah and then at the Laie Hawaii temple visitors center for three years where Eubank served as the director of the visitors center.

Publications
 Mark Eubank's Utah Weather (1979)
 Weather Detectives: Fun-filled Facts, Experiments, And Activities for Kids (2004) Illustrated by Mark A. Hicks

See also
 Peter Sinks

References

1940 births
Latter Day Saints from California
Living people
Television anchors from Salt Lake City
University of California, Los Angeles alumni
University of Utah alumni
Latter Day Saints from Utah